Lihir Group is an island group in Papua New Guinea, located north of New Ireland, at . It is a part of Bismarck Archipelago. Largest island of the group is Lihir (a.k.a. Niolam), other islands include: Mali, Mahur, Masahet and Sanambiet.

External links 
 Photos from Lihir Island
 Lihir Gold Mine

Archipelagoes of Papua New Guinea
Bismarck Archipelago
New Ireland Province